is a 1969 Japanese action film directed by Yasuharu Hasebe. It stars Tetsuya Watari. The film is considered the first film called the Nikkatsu New Action Film.

When the bounty hunter Tetsuya Asai returns from Alaska, he learns that his sister, Satoko, has been killed by someone. One day he happens to see a gangster man wearing a Satoko's pendant.

Cast
 Tetsuya Watari as Asai Tetsuya
 Tatsuya Fuji as Yada 
 Tamio Kawachi as Sado
 Isao Bito as Noro
 Joe Akira as Taro
 Masao Shimizu as Yamamuro

References

External links
Savage Wolf Pack at Nikkatsu

1969 films
Films directed by Yasuharu Hasebe
Nikkatsu films
1960s Japanese-language films
1960s Japanese films